Austrophanes robustum is a species of beetle in the family Cerambycidae, the only species in the genus Austrophanes.

References

Hesperophanini